Abrayevo (Abray) is a rural locality (a village) in Chuvalkipovsky Selsoviet of Chishminsky District, Bashkortostan, Russia. The population was 320 as of 2010. There are 5 streets.

Geography 
Abrayevo is located 37 km south of Chishmy (the district's administrative centre) by road. Staromusino is the nearest rural locality.

Ethnicity 
The village is inhabited by Tatars and others.

References 

Rural localities in Chishminsky District
Ufa Governorate